Act Your Rage is a compilation album by American punk band the Undead. It was released May 8, 1989, on Post Mortem Records/Forefront Records. It featured unreleased songs recorded between 1984 and 1986. Most of the songs were recorded during the recordings of the "Never Say Die" single.

Track listing
"Evening of Desire" (Bobby Steele)
"Hollywood Boulevard" (Steele)
"Gimme Your Autograph" (Steele)
"The Way We Behave" (Steele/Dave Street)
"Eve Of Destruction" (Philip Sloan)
"Undead" (Steele)
"I Don't Wanna Go" (Steele)
"We Don't Want the Poor in New York City"
"Social Reason" (Steele/Street)
"Put Your Clothes Back On" (Steele/Street)
"R.A.T.T. F.I.N.K." (Allan Sherman/Wills/Anderson)

Pressings
 Five test copies owned by Bobby Steele
 2,000-5,000 black vinyl copies
 1,500 white vinyl copies with blue swirls (teal)
 1,500 white vinyl copies with red swirls (pink)
 750 blue vinyl copies
 750 yellow vinyl copies
 750 red vinyl copies
 100 clear vinyl copies
 53 green vinyl copies
 30 orange vinyl copies

Personnel
 Bobby Steele – producer, guitar, vocals, bass
 Steve Zing – drums (on tracks 3, 4, 5, 7, 8, 9, 11), backing vocals 
 Rich Matalian – drums (on tracks 1, 6, 10)
 Andy Cardenas - drums (on track 2)
 Recorded at Reel Platinum and Centre for Media Arts

See also
Cover Art: Rick "Spine" Mountfort

The Undead albums
1989 compilation albums
Horror punk compilation albums